The majority of presidents of the United States have been clean-shaven, including the Founding Fathers.  Between 1861 and 1913, all but two presidents (Andrew Johnson and William McKinley) wore either beards or mustaches during their tenure in office. Since 1913 all presidents have been clean-shaven except for Harry Truman for a brief period of time in 1948.

Overview
John Quincy Adams (1825–1829) was the first U.S. president to have notable facial hair, with long sideburns.  But the first major departure from the tradition of clean-shaven chief executives was Abraham Lincoln (1861–1865), who was supposedly (and famously) influenced by a letter received from an eleven-year-old girl named Grace Bedell, to start growing a beard to improve his chances of being elected.  After Lincoln, all but two presidents over the next 48 years sported some form of facial hair; the exceptions being Andrew Johnson (1865–1869) and William McKinley (1897–1901).

Beards and mustaches fell out of favor due to health reasons, as described on the PBS website pertaining to a documentary on tuberculosis: "Most men at the turn of the [twentieth] century featured stylish beards or mustaches, but showing off a smooth face became a new trend once public health officials maintained that men could transmit dangerous infectious particles through the scruff of their facial hair. An editorial in a 1903 Harper's Weekly stated, "Now that consumption is no longer consumption, but tuberculosis, and is not hereditary but infectious…the theory of science is that the beard is infected with the germs of tuberculosis." Ultimately, the clean-shaven look became a symbol of the new middle-class man during the period that Harper's Weekly labeled "the revolt against the whisker."

The most recent president to have had facial hair was William Howard Taft (1909–1913). President Harry Truman briefly grew a mustache and goatee (which he jokingly referred to as a "Jeff Davis") while vacationing in Key West, Florida, after the 1948 presidential election.

The last major candidate from any party to have a beard was Charles Evans Hughes, who was defeated at the 1916 presidential election.  The last major party candidate for the presidency to have any facial hair was Thomas E. Dewey, who had a mustache, and was defeated at both the 1944 and 1948 presidential elections.  Some pundits even claimed that public disapproval of Dewey's mustache may have contributed to his two electoral defeats.

Social scientists have researched the effect of facial hair on the electability of presidential candidates, and currently consider facial hair to have a negative effect on candidates.  Today, the existence of facial hair on potential presidential candidates is regularly noted (albeit somewhat jokingly) as a harmful factor.

Following is a list of American presidents who had facial hair at any time during their tenure.

List

Notes

References

External links
 Heads of State (February 14, 2010 New York Times graphic of all presidential hairstyles including facial hair)

Facial hair
Facial hair